Tangent is a city in Linn County, Oregon, United States. The population was 1,231 at the 2020 census.

Tangent was the site of a railway station on the Southern Pacific line south of Albany. The federal government established a post office in Tangent on September 17, 1872.

Geography

Climate
This region experiences warm (but not hot) and dry summers, with no average monthly temperatures above .  According to the Köppen Climate Classification system, Tangent has a warm-summer Mediterranean climate, abbreviated "Csb" on climate maps.

Demographics

2010 census
As of the census of 2010, there were 1,164 people, 410 households, and 315 families living in the city. The racial makeup of the city was 89.4% White, 0.2% African American, 0.8% Native American, 0.3% Asian, 0.2% Pacific Islander, 4.6% from other races, and 4.5% from two or more races. Hispanic or Latino of any race were 8.4% of the population.

There were 410 households, of which 39.0% had children under the age of 18 living with them, 58.3% were married couples living together, 13.4% had a female householder with no husband present, 5.1% had a male householder with no wife present, and 23.2% were non-families. 16.8% of all households were made up of individuals, and 5.2% had someone living alone who was 65 years of age or older. The average household size was 2.83 and the average family size was 3.17.

The median age in the city was 36.7 years. 29.2% of residents were under the age of 18; 7.4% were between the ages of 18 and 24; 24.5% were from 25 to 44; 26% were from 45 to 64; and 12.8% were 65 years of age or older. The gender makeup of the city was 49.4% male and 50.6% female.

2000 census
As of the census of 2000, there were 933 people, 339 households, and 262 families living in the city. The population density was 246.9 people per square mile (95.3/km2). There were 366 housing units at an average density of 96.9 per square mile (37.4/km2). The racial makeup of the city was 95.71% White, 1.07% Native American, 0.32% Pacific Islander, 1.29% from other races, and 1.61% from two or more races. Hispanic or Latino of any race were 2.79% of the population.

There were 339 households, out of which 35.4% had children under the age of 18 living with them, 66.1% were married couples living together, 7.4% had a female householder with no husband present, and 22.7% were non-families. 17.1% of all households were made up of individuals, and 6.8% had someone living alone who was 65 years of age or older. The average household size was 2.75 and the average family size was 3.08.

In the city, the population was spread out, with 27.9% under the age of 18, 5.9% from 18 to 24, 32.7% from 25 to 44, 22.8% from 45 to 64, and 10.7% who were 65 years of age or older. The median age was 37 years. For every 100 females, there were 97.3 males. For every 100 females age 18 and over, there were 96.8 males.

The median income for a household in the city was $44,231, and the median income for a family was $50,450. Males had a median income of $36,458 versus $21,250 for females. The per capita income for the city was $17,012. About 5.2% of families and 6.4% of the population were below the poverty line, including 9.0% of those under age 18 and 2.0% of those age 65 or over.

References

External links
 Entry for Tangent in the Oregon Blue Book

Cities in Oregon
Cities in Linn County, Oregon
1893 establishments in Oregon
Populated places established in 1893